Xiejiatan Township (Mandarin: 谢家滩乡) is a township in Hualong Hui Autonomous County, Haidong, Qinghai, China. In 2010, Xiejiatan Township had a total population of 6,671: 3,392 males and 3,279 females: 1,674 aged under 14, 4,540 aged between 15 and 65 and 457 aged over 65.

References 

Township-level divisions of Qinghai
Haidong